Mr. Myombekere and His Wife Bugonoka, Their Son Ntulanalwo and Daughter Bulihwali (original title: Bwana Myombekere na Bibi Bugonoka, Ntulanalwo na Bulihwali) is a novel by Tanzanian author Aniceti Kitereza. The novel is an extended story depicting historical life of the Kerewe through three generations.

It was first published in 1981 in Swahili by Tanzania Publishing House, but was originally completed already in 1945 in Kiterezas mother tongue Kerewe. As no publishing house wanted to publish a novel in the endangered language Kerewe, Kitereza himself translated the novel into Swahili shortly before his own death, and it took 35 years to find a publisher. Since, it has been translated into English, German, French and Swedish. The novel is the only one to have been written in Kerewe, and the most comprehensive novel on pre-colonial life and customs published in an African language.

The German translation was published in 1990 in two parts with posthumous titles and notes, explaining the cultural and linguistical background a reader may need. The French translation by Simon Baguma Mweze and Olivier Barlet was edited in two parts in 1999: Les Enfants du faiseur de pluie  and Le Tueur de serpents, and published by L'Harmattan. The Swedish translation is based on the German, but only the first part has been published. The English edition of 2002 by Gabriel Ruhumbika was translated directly from Kerewe to English, thus being the only translation not having passed via Swahili.

References 

1981 novels
1945 novels
Tanzanian novels
Novels set in Tanzania
Swahili literature